Dibdiba is a village in Rampur District, Uttar Pradesh, India. The village lies east of New Delhi, and the nearest large town is Rudrapur.

References

Villages in Rampur district